Jacob Fields Wade (April 1, 1912 – February 1, 2006) was an American professional baseball pitcher who appeared in Major League Baseball for the Detroit Tigers (1936–1938), Boston Red Sox (1939), St. Louis Browns (1939), Chicago White Sox (1942–1944), New York Yankees (1946) and Washington Senators (1946). He was nicknamed "Whistlin' Jake". 

A native of Morehead City, North Carolina, Wade made his major league debut with the Detroit Tigers in 1936 as he went 4–5. His most productive season came in 1937, when he posted career highs in wins (7), starts (25), complete games (7), strikeouts (69) and innings pitched (165-1/3).

The next two years, Wade divided his playing time with Detroit and the Montreal Royals of the International League. Before the 1939 season he was traded by Detroit to the Boston Red Sox in the same deal that brought Pinky Higgins to the Tigers. He finished the season with the St. Louis Browns. Then joined the Toledo Mud Hens of the American Association in 1940, and played for the Indianapolis Indians (AA) the following year. In 1942 he returned to the majors with the Chicago White Sox. After serving in the military, he played his last major league season with the New York Yankees and Washington Senators in 1946.

In an eight-season major-league career, Wade posted a 27–30 record with 291 strikeouts and a 5.00 ERA in 668-1/3 innings.
 
Wade joined the Jersey City Giants of the International League in 1947, as he posted a 17–5 record with a 2.51 ERA helping his team to the league championship. He ended his professional baseball career with a 7–6 and a 4.96 ERA for the Buffalo Bisons (IL) in 1950. Following his playing career, he worked as an electronics repair technician at Cherry Point Marine Corps Air Station until his retirement in 1976.
 
Wade died in Wildwood, North Carolina, at age 93. At the time of his death, he was the oldest living former player of the Chicago White Sox. His younger brother, Ben Wade, was also a major league pitcher. The municipal ballpark in Morehead City, North Carolina is named "Wade Brothers Field" after Wade, his younger brother Ben, and an older brother, Winfield ("Wink") who played minor league baseball.

See also
 Chicago White Sox all-time roster
 1937 Detroit Tigers season

External links
Baseball Almanac
Baseball Library
Baseball Reference
Historic Baseball

1912 births
2006 deaths
Baseball players from North Carolina
Beaumont Exporters players
Boston Red Sox players
Buffalo Bisons (minor league) players
Chicago White Sox players
Detroit Tigers players
Evansville Hubs players
Goldsboro Goldbugs players
Indianapolis Indians players
Jersey City Giants players
Major League Baseball pitchers
Moline Plowboys players
Montreal Royals players
NC State Wolfpack baseball players
New Bern Bears players
New York Yankees players
People from Morehead City, North Carolina
Portland Beavers players
Raleigh Capitals players
St. Louis Browns players
San Diego Padres (minor league) players
Shreveport Sports players
Toledo Mud Hens players
United States Navy personnel of World War II
Washington Senators (1901–1960) players